Kurt Wrigley (born 13 September 1969) is an Australian rugby league coach and former player. He played for the Cronulla-Sutherland Sharks, St. George Dragons, and the Adelaide Rams and has also been an assistant coach at the South Sydney Rabbitohs and Newcastle Knights.

Retirement
After his retirement at the end of 1997, Wrigley went on to become a qualified coach, serving as an assistant coach for the Adelaide Rams. He then moved to the Cronulla Sharks and worked in coaching and development, coaching the Matthew's Cup side to a premiership in 2000. Following that, he took a role as NRL Assistant Coach with St. George Illawarra Dragons from 2004 - 2008. He then spent a year as Chief Executive of Oztag Australia.

He worked as an NRL assistant coach with South Sydney Rabbitohs between 2010 and 2016. In 2015, he was named as the Queensland under-20s State of Origin coach.

In 2017, Wrigley joined the Newcastle Knights as an assistant coach, before leaving for other opportunities outside of rugby league in 2018.

Kurt is now a facilitator at Leading Teams.

Career playing statistics

Point scoring summary

Matches played

References

External links 
 Kurt Wrigley's profile on the Leading Teams website

1969 births
Living people
Australian rugby league players
Cronulla-Sutherland Sharks players
Rugby league fullbacks
Adelaide Rams players
Rugby league five-eighths
St. George Dragons players
Rugby league players from Toowoomba